Stenny may refer to:

Stenhousemuir, a town in Scotland
Steve and Jenny of the Dutch pagan folk band Omnia